Estradiol distearate (EDS), also known as estradiol dioctadecanoate, is an estrogen and an estrogen ester which was never marketed. It is a long-acting prodrug of estradiol in the body.

See also 
 Estradiol dienantate
 List of estrogen esters § Estradiol esters

References 

Abandoned drugs
Estradiol esters
Prodrugs
Stearate esters